James "Jim" Underdown (born October 9, 1960) has been the executive director of The Center for Inquiry (CFI) West in Los Angeles since 1999. The Center for Inquiry is a non-profit educational organization with headquarters in Amherst, New York, whose primary mission is to foster a secular society based on science, reason, freedom of inquiry, and humanist values. CFI West is the largest facility in the organization outside Amherst.

Underdown founded the Center for Inquiry Investigations Group (formerly the Independent Investigations Group), a volunteer-based organization, in January 2000 at the Center for Inquiry West in Los Angeles, California. The Center for Inquiry Investigations Group (CFIIG),  investigates fringe science, paranormal and extraordinary claims from a rational, scientific viewpoint, and disseminates factual information about such inquiries to the public. The original Center for Inquiry Investigation Group is located in Los Angeles, and has a sister group, the CFIIG San Francisco Bay area. The CFIIG maintains field investigators in Washington D.C., Atlanta, Denver, Chicago, Edinburgh, Scotland, London, England, Milan, Italy, Cape Town, South Africa, Lagos, Nigeria, and Alberta, Canada. Altogether, the CFI Investigations Groups are the largest paranormal investigations team in the world. The CFIIG offers $250,000 to anyone who can prove paranormal or supernatural ability under test conditions, and has in the past administered preliminary demonstrations for the James Randi Educational Foundation (JREF) $1,000,000 Paranormal Challenge.

James was made a Fellow of the Committee for Skeptical Inquiry in 2020.

Underdown is a 1982 graduate of DePauw University in Greencastle, Indiana, where he received his B.A. in English with an emphasis in composition.  He was also the starting defensive end for the DePauw Tiger football team which recorded a 9–1 record in 1981. That team was ranked 9th in the final 1981 Division III football poll, and was inducted into the DePauw University Athletics Hall of Fame in 2016. Between 1982 and 1999, he worked as a school teacher, truck driver, painter, limo driver, hotel clerk, furniture mover, football coach, carpenter, and bouncer.  In the late 1970s, Underdown tried to win a $500 prize by wrestling a bear .

History 
After moving to Los Angeles in 1992, Underdown taught comedy traffic school for the Improv Traffic School and worked as a carpenter until he joined the Center for Inquiry in May 1999. During his time in Los Angeles, He wrote and directed 2 short films: A Day in the Life of Frank Sinatra, a docushort about a homeless man with a famous name, and Dear Father, a black comedy about a priest who gets a letter from a man he molested 20 years before.  He also wrote and directed a one-act play called Party of 13, a secular retelling of the Last Supper. Party of 13 has run 3 times in Los Angeles.   He is also the host and creator of "The Peep Show", a humorous roundtable discussion that ran for 2 dozen episodes on public access TV in the mid-1990s. Regular guests on the show included Phil Lamar, Joe Manno, Robb Wenner, Colleen Wainwright, Patrick Collins, and Rob Guillory.

In 1988 James declared himself Poet Laureate of Calumet City, Illinois, and began touring Midwest comedy clubs as Jim U-Boat, a moniker from high school.   In response to Underdown's claim to being Calumet City's poet laureate, its mayor Robert Stefaniak stated that Underdown was "a lousy poet" who was "not recognized by the community".  Interviewed by WKQX radio station in front of City Hall, Underdown states although he has never lived or worked in Calumet City, it "reflects the blue-collar nature of my poems".

Notable shows Underdown performed in during the late 1980s/early 1990s include the Serious Art Comedy Show at the Roxy (Chicago), "The Best of Blue Collar Art" at the Elbo Room (Chicago), and "Mr. Saigon" also at the Elbo Room which featured Matt Walsh and Matt Besser of the Upright Citizen's Brigade. In the play written by Terry Curtis Fox, Underdown played a uniformed police officer in Cops.  NoHo LA writes "one wishes his role was a bit longer".

Underdown created the Steve Allen Theater in 2002 and hired Amit Itelman to be its founding artistic director soon after. According to the NY Times, "...the Steve Allen Theater is not just any theater...it is known for its willingness to embrace controversy. (In June -- 6/6/06 to be exact -- it held a Satanic High Mass for leather and tuxedo-clad devil-worshippers.)"

In the media 
Underdown is one of the co-hosts of the Center for Inquiry's flagship podcast, Point of Inquiry.
He and co-host Leighann Lord are the new interviewers on the longtime show.
Underdown is also the co-host, along with Tony Ortega and Jerry Minor, of The Cult Awareness Podcast that discusses Scientology, Jehovah's Witnesses, and other subjects.

Underdown was billed on the Dr. Phil show as a professional skeptic wrote about his experience as the lone skeptic, "Maybe the show is afraid of challenging the views of so many of their viewers. But it would have nice to have a fair chance to do so".  First Underdown read for a small audience as a psychic, then a professional psychic read the same group.  This was the first time he had tried to do a group cold-reading and left 3 of the 10 participants in tears.  When later it was revealed to the participants that James was a fake psychic, they stated that the professional psychic had given a much better reading.  Underdown's response was "of course she is, she is much better practiced".  Another psychic claimed that James was actually a real psychic and bitter,  to which he responded that he is not bitter but "you make money doing the same thing he can do for free."

On the Oprah Winfrey Network Miracle Detective show Underdown was called in to investigate an angelic apparition that people claim cured a 14-year-old severely disabled child at Presbyterian Hemby Children's Hospital in Charlotte, North Carolina. The "angel" was shown to be sunlight from a hidden window, and the little girl is still severely handicapped.

Lecturing at skeptical events, Underdown has spoken on the topic "Are there similarities between the paranormal claims people make today and the miracles found in the Bible?"  Underdown looked at 5 miracles in the Bible and relates them to real-life paranormal investigations at ReasonFest May 2011. Using only invisible thread, a very long pole and a Mr. Coffee pot lid Jim Underdown shows the audience at JREF, The Amaz!ing Meeting: TAM9 From Outer Space how to fake their own UFO photographs.

Underdown joined the cast of "Battle of the Psychics" in Kiev, Ukraine in 2012, for the taping of the show's 10th season. He appeared on the show as one of the jury members who analyze the performance of the alleged psychics who are competing for prize money. The show's website reads: "For the first time in history, Battle" in the jury - an outspoken skeptic, internationally known researcher of paranormal phenomena, American James Underdown. Joining Underdown as judges on the show are host Paul Kostitsyn, well-known Russian actress Alika Smekhova, and world famous spoonbender and illusionist, Uri Geller. When asked why he would participate in a show that assumes psychic ability is real, Underdown responded, "This is an opportunity to square off with the world's most famous (alleged) psychic in one of the world's biggest hotbeds of psychic belief. Why not try to bring some skepticism where it is so sorely needed?"

Speaking to the Santa Monica College's newly formed skeptic club, Underdown said, "'Critical thinking skills, not just with this stuff, the idea of being able to know the difference between what's true and what isn’t, will serve you very well in your life in many different ideas"'.

References

External links 
 centerforinquiry.org
 cfiig.org
 

American skeptics
1960 births
Living people